Shafi Muhammad Burfat also known as Shafi Burfat (Sindhi: شفيع محمد برفت); born November 25, 1965, is the founder and current chairman of Jeay Sindh Muttahida Mahaz; a separatist and liberal political party in Sindh, Pakistan who believes in the freedom of Sindhudesh from Pakistan.

Disappearance
Burfat is a fugitive escaping persecution since 1994. Media has reported that Shafi Muhammd Burfat had fled to Afghanistan where he established his control center in Kabul. But some photographs and a column in The daily Jang newspaper has reported Shafi Burfat's presence in an event on Human Rights in UN headquarters at Geneva.

On 1 April 2013 home ministry of Pakistan declared JSMM as a terrorist organization and imposed ban. The Crime Investigation Department (CID) of Sindh police and Federal Investigation Agency (FIA) has added Shafi Muhammad Burfat to its Red Book for his alleged separatists actions against Pakistan.

Burfat has rejected the Pakistan government's portrayals of JSMM as a terrorist organisation and has instead said "it was not hidden that Pakistan government has been nurturing and sponsoring extremism and providing safe havens to terrorist groups".

See also
G M Sayed
List of fugitives from justice who disappeared
Muzafar Bhutto
Sajjad Shar

References

1965 births
Fugitives
Fugitives wanted by Pakistan
Living people
Pakistani exiles
Pakistani expatriates in Afghanistan
Refugees in Germany
Sindhi people